Winston Leonardo Abreu Soler (born April 5, 1977) is a Dominican former professional baseball pitcher. At age 16, he was signed by the Atlanta Braves as a minor league free agent on July 2, 1993. He bats and throws right-handed. He played in Major League Baseball (MLB) for the Baltimore Orioles, Washington Nationals, Tampa Bay Rays and Cleveland Indians and in Nippon Professional Baseball (NPB) for the Chiba Lotte Marines.

Career

Minor league career
Abreu progressed slowly, and (except for four games) did not advance out of Single-A until 2001, compiling an ERA of 4.64 in a full season at Double-A Greenville. After that season, he was traded to the San Diego Padres for Rudy Seánez, and then the following spring to the Chicago Cubs for Syketo Anderson, and after 11 appearances, released six weeks later. He was picked up by the Kansas City Royals, and finished the 2002 season at Double-A Wichita with a solid 3.32 ERA. At the end of the season, he was signed by the New York Yankees. He did not play in 2003 due to injury, and was released in January 2004. He was signed by the Los Angeles Dodgers, had a few unimpressive outings, then released, and was then signed by the Arizona Diamondbacks, where he posted an ERA of 5.68 in Triple-A. In 2004, he was released again, played a bit in the Mexican league, and was signed by the Baltimore Orioles in December 2005.

Baltimore Orioles
In 2006, with the Orioles' Triple-A affiliate, the Ottawa Lynx, Abreu had his first good Triple-A season, appearing in 46 games with an ERA of 2.48, and, at age 29 finally was called up to the big leagues. Unfortunately for him, in his seven appearances, he pitched 8 innings, but allowed 10 hits, 6 walks, and 9 runs, for an ERA of 10.13

Washington Nationals
In 2007, the Washington Nationals signed him to a minor league contract, and he started the spring at Triple-A Columbus in an outstanding fashion, pitching 18 innings and allowing only one run. On May 8, he was called up, and in his first 11 appearances, had allowed runs in only two games, amassing an ERA of 2.31. But then over his next 8 appearances, he allowed runs in seven games, and his ERA ballooned to 6.38; on June 20, he was designated for assignment. Abreu was called back up in September when rosters expanded. Abreu finished the 2007 season with an 0–1 record with a 5.93 ERA in 26 games. He became a free agent after the season.

Chiba Lotte Marines
Before the start of the 2008 season, Abreu signed with the Chiba Lotte Marines of Japan's Pacific League.

Tampa Bay Rays
On February 6, 2009, Abreu signed a minor league contract with an invitation to spring training with the Tampa Bay Rays. On June 14, 2009, Abreu's contract was purchased from Triple-A Durham to replace the injured Jason Isringhausen. On June 27, Abreu was designated for assignment by the Rays.

Cleveland Indians
On July 2, 2009, Abreu was claimed off waivers from the Rays by the Cleveland Indians.  During his tenure with the Indians, Abreu was given a three-game suspension after hitting Jack Hannahan with a pitch on July 25.

The Indians designated him for assignment on August 1, 2009. On August 5, 2009, though, he was outrighted to Triple-A Columbus.

Back to Tampa Bay
On August 6, 2009, Abreu re-signed with the Rays and was assigned to Triple-A Durham.

Toronto Blue Jays
On December 1, 2010, Abreu signed a minor league contract with the Toronto Blue Jays. He pitched for Triple-A Las Vegas, where in 53 games, he went 8–5 with a 3.66 ERA, striking out 72 over 66.1 innings

Mexican League
He pitched in 2012 with the Diablos Rojos del México of the Mexican League, where in 45 games, he went 4–1 with a 3.83 ERA with 15 saves, striking out 38 over 44.2 innings. He began 2013 with the Delfines del Carmen, before signing with the Rojos del Águila de Veracruz. In 11 appearances in the league that year, he went 2–0 with a 1.80 ERA with 3 saves, striking out 7 over 10 innings.

Bridgeport Bluefish
On May 7, 2013, Abreu signed with the Bridgeport Bluefish of the Atlantic League. Abreu re-signed with the Bluefish for the 2014 season.

Joplin Blasters
Abreu signed with the Joplin Blasters for the 2015 season in their inaugural season. The Blasters play in the American Association of Independent Professional Baseball.

Diablos Rojos del México
On June 24, 2016, Abreu signed with the Diablos Rojos del México of the Mexican Baseball League. He was released on September 23, 2016.

Cleburne Railroaders
On April 20, 2017, Abreu signed with the Cleburne Railroaders of the American Association. He was released on October 30, 2017.

Kansas City Royals
On January 15, 2019, Abreu signed a minor league contract with the Kansas City Royals. He became a free agent following the 2019 season. He re-signed with the Royals for the 2020 season. Abreu did not play in a game in 2020 due to the cancellation of the minor league season because of the COVID-19 pandemic. He became a free agent on November 2, 2020.

Coaching
In 2021, he was named the pitching coach for the Billings Mustangs in the Independent Pioneer League.

References

External links

MiLB

1977 births
Living people
Águilas Cibaeñas players
Azucareros del Este players
Baltimore Orioles players
Bridgeport Bluefish players
Cardenales de Lara players
Caribes de Anzoátegui players
Chiba Lotte Marines players
Cleburne Railroaders players
Cleveland Indians players
Columbus Clippers players
Danville Braves players
Delfines de Ciudad del Carmen players
Diablos Rojos del México players
Dominican Republic expatriate baseball players in Canada
Dominican Republic expatriate baseball players in Japan
Dominican Republic expatriate baseball players in Mexico
Dominican Republic expatriate baseball players in the United States
Durham Bulls players
Eugene Emeralds players
Greenville Braves players
Guerreros de Oaxaca players
Gulf Coast Braves players
Jacksonville Suns players
Joplin Blasters players
Las Vegas 51s players
Macon Braves players
Major League Baseball pitchers
Major League Baseball players from the Dominican Republic
Mexican League baseball pitchers
Minor league baseball coaches
Myrtle Beach Pelicans players
Navegantes del Magallanes players
Ottawa Lynx players
People from Cotuí
Richmond Braves players
Rojos del Águila de Veracruz players
Tampa Bay Rays players
Tiburones de La Guaira players
Tigres de Aragua players
Toros del Este players
Tucson Sidewinders players
Washington Nationals players
West Tennessee Diamond Jaxx players
Wichita Wranglers players
Winnipeg Goldeyes players
Dominican Republic expatriate baseball players in Venezuela